George Latimer (July 8, 1750 – June 12, 1825) was a Philadelphia merchant and member of the Pennsylvania House of Representatives. He served as speaker of the Pennsylvania House 1794–1798.

Early life
Latimer was born in Newport, Delaware.

Personal life
Latimer married Margaret Cathcart on February 20, 1771.  They had two daughters and one son.

He was severely injured after being thrown from his horse.  He could not walk a great distance and had to be driven to his place of business.

By 1892, he had no living direct descendants.

Military service
Latimer was a lieutenant-colonel in the Revolutionary Army.

Political activities
In 1779, Latimer was elected as an assemblyman from New Castle County, Delaware.

He served in the Pennsylvania House of Representatives from 1792 to 1799.  He ran for a House seat in 1789.

In 1791, Latimer (along with Henry Drinker, Robert Hare, Joseph Heister, George Fry, William Montgomery, and Samuel Miles) was named in a bill as a commissioner of a company to open a canal and lock navigation system between the Schuylkill and Susquehanna Rivers, the Schuylkill and Susquehanna Navigation Company.  The bill passed the House and was scheduled to be read for a third time in the state Senate.

He was named as a presidential elector for the Election of 1792.

Latimer served as Speaker of the Pennsylvania House of Representatives from 1794–1798.  Election dates:
 1794: December 3, 1793
 1795: December 4, 1794
 1796: December 2, 1795 (34 votes....William Maclay had 13 votes)
 1797: December 7, 1796
 1798: unknown

Latimer was chairman of a meeting in Philadelphia for the support of State Senate candidate Benjamin R. Morgan.

He was a collector of customs at Philadelphia, 1798 – May 11, 1802 (replaced by General Peter Muhlenberg).  The Poulson's American Daily Advertiser claimed that he was forced to resign and hoped the details would be made public.  They also suggested that General Muhlenberg was put in this position so as to prevent a future gubernatorial candidacy.

In 1802, Latimer was nominated for a seat in the United States House of Representatives by the Federalist Party.  He came in fourth out of six candidates, receiving 1,599 votes.

He served as a Federalist presidential elector in the Election of 1804.

Business Activities
Latimer was elected as a director of the Bank of the United States in October, 1791.

Latimer served as president of the Union Fire Insurance Company.  His merchant businesses were located at 71 South Wharves and 1 Pine Street.

Other activities
Latimer became a member of the Hibernian Society in 1790.

Sources

 

1750 births
1825 deaths
Members of the Pennsylvania House of Representatives
Speakers of the Pennsylvania House of Representatives
Politicians from Philadelphia
People from Newport, Delaware
People of colonial Delaware
Continental Army officers from Delaware